William I. Robinson (born March 28, 1959) is an American professor of sociology at the University of California, Santa Barbara.  His work focuses on political economy, globalization, Latin America and historical materialism. He is a member of the International Parliamentary and Civil Society Mission to Investigate the Political Transition in Iraq.

Early life
In the early 1980s Robinson worked as a journalist in war-torn Nicaragua. He was a member of Union of Nicaraguan Journalists (past member and officer 1984–1990).

Academic life
He then went on to study for his BA in Journalism with the Friends World College in Nairobi (Kenya), Ibadan (Nigeria), and Costa Rica. Following this he received both his MA in Latin American Studies  and his PhD in Sociology at the University of New Mexico.

Academic work

Robinson wrote many academic journal articles and books, and made several contributions to Al Jazeera. Many of his works have been translated into Spanish.

Theoretical debates
Entire symposiums and issues of scholarly journals have focused on discussing and debating Robinson's theories on global capitalism, class, and political economy. See for example the May 2012 issue of Critical Sociology , the April 2001 issue of Theory and Society, the debate between Robinson and noted Marxian theorist Ellen Meiksins Wood in issue 15 of the journal Historical Materialism, the debate between British political economist in the 2009 volume 1(2) of the journal of the contemporary science association.

Controversy
In 2009 Robinson forwarded an e-mail to his "Sociology of Globalization" course, to spur class discussion, that had photos of the 2008-9 Israeli assault on Gaza paralleling photos of the German occupation of the Warsaw Ghetto during the Second World War. The e-mail was widely circulated and became the subject of media controversy, after it was revealed that the Anti-Defamation League (ADL), a group generally considered to be pro-Israel, advised university administrators to punish him. A Jewish student in the class brought a complaint against Robinson, that she was intimidated by the e-mail. The ADL criticized Robinson, considering the matter a case of academic misconduct, while California Scholars for Academic Freedom considered it a case of academic freedom and the charges without merit. Scholars for Peace in the Middle East, a pro-Israel group of academics, said that the incident had raised "serious questions about his judgment and the value of his teaching," and that "Concern for academic freedom does not justify or erase what is clearly and profoundly flawed pedagogy." Robinson stated that his critics had confused his criticism of Israeli policies with anti-Semitism. "That's like saying if I condemn the U.S. government for the invasion of Iraq, I'm anti-American. It's the most absurd, baseless argument."

University officials initiated an investigation of Robinson to probe the allegations that the email Robinson had forwarded to his class was inappropriate and in violation of the faculty code of ethics.  The charges were dismissed in May 2009.

Works

Robinson, William I. (2014). Globalization and the Crisis of Humanity. Cambridge University Press. 
 We Will Not Be Silenced: The Academic Repression of Israel's Critics Paperback (2017) with Maryam S. Griffin 

Robinson, William I. (2019). Into the Tempest: Essays on the New Global Capitalism. Haymarket Books.
Robinson, William I. (2020). Global Police State. Pluto Press. 
Robinson, William I. (2022). Global Civil War: Capitalism Post-Pandemic. PM Press.
Robinson, William I. (2022). Can Global Capitalism Endure? Clarity Press.

Notes

External links
William I. Robinson at the University of California, Santa Barbara
 William I. Robinson at SourceWatch

Living people
1959 births
University of New Mexico alumni
University of California, Santa Barbara faculty
American sociologists
Jewish sociologists
American social sciences writers
Historians of Latin America
Writers about globalization